Around the Rings (ATR) is an Internet-based publication covering the business and politics of the Olympic Movement, as well as a wide array of issues in international sports.

ATR had its beginnings in the late 1980s, when Atlanta was bidding for the 1996 Olympic Games. The company – originally known as Radio Atlanta – was founded in May 1992 by Ed Hula. The company's global headquarters remains in Atlanta, with contributors and sales staff around the world.

Over the years, ATR has become known as “the go-to source for Olympic bid information” and is frequently quoted across all international media. A subscription to the site is required in order to access premium content, although many articles and features are open to all visitors.

Around the Rings delivers news across every distribution platform: print, online, email, and mobile app.

History 
Beginning in 1992, Ed Hula formed Radio Atlanta to provide radio networks in the U.S. with reporting about the 1996 Olympics. Hula has provided coverage about every Olympics since Barcelona.

From 1994 to 1996, he was the Olympics correspondent for WGST, the official “information station” for the Atlanta Games.

From 1998 to 2001 he was based in Sydney as the Olympics editor for Radio 2UE, the rights-holding radio station for the 2000 Olympic Games.

Even in the mid-1990s, Hula was in the vanguard of new media, when he served as AOL’s Olympics reporter in Atlanta.

While delivering his radio coverage to clients worldwide, Hula realized there was a need for specialized business news about the Olympics .

In the mid-1990s, he was asked to write a column for a weekly political newsletter that was mailed out across the Southeast. “The Hula Report”, as it was known, soon outgrew its one-page space allotment and became its own four- to eight-page fax distributed twice monthly.

By 1998 electronic technology and delivery platforms were becoming increasingly important. ATR's website, launched in late 1996, was already becoming a powerful point of delivery. As the fax expanded to 12 to 16 pages, it became necessary to convert the publication to an email format – and to open an office in Sydney, Australia, to cover the Games of 2000. Sydney was a watershed for Around the Rings. It also resulted in phenomenal growth for their readership as well as the range of their publications.

The Nagano Olympics in 1998 were a milestone for Around the Rings and the Olympics when Ed Hula became the first New Media journalist accredited for the Games.

Events

During that time, Around the Rings developed an events arm with its Newsmaker Breakfast series. These networking events provide the opportunity for journalists, sports marketers and others with an interest in the Games to meet and talk in an informal setting.

Guests have included Jacques Rogge, then president of the European Olympic Committees, Gianna Angelopoulos-Daskalaki of Athens 2004, Prince Albert of Monaco, U. S. Olympic Committee presidents, Dmitry Chernyshenko of Sochi 2014, athletics great Sergey Bubka, NBC Olympics chief Dick Ebersol and many other well-known figures in the Olympic Movement.

Newsmaker Breakfasts have become an international event, having been hosted in Acapulco, Atlanta, Beijing, Chicago, Copenhagen, London, New York, Salt Lake City, Sydney, and Vancouver.

In 2012, the website celebrated its 20th anniversary cementing its claim "20 years at #1."

Expansion to football

In June 2009 Around the Rings created a second internet publication, World Football Insider (WFI). The company launched Insider after realizing the need for a reputable publication about the business of international football. Insider is the first online publication to focus on the business of football. Since its inception, correspondents have reported from Zurich, South Africa, Kuala Lumpur, Moscow, Rio de Janeiro, Nassau and many other locations to provide on-the scene reporting of major football events. It is a primary source of news about preparations for the FIFA World Cup and delivers information about FIFA, its 208 member associations, the business of the six continental confederations, as well as the sponsors of the Beautiful Game.

Publications

ATR publishes high-impact magazines for major events on the Olympic calendar. These magazines are distributed at the events, typically at the conference site and in hotels and press centers.

ATR Daily Editions: The Daily Editions, published during the Olympic Games, target high level visitors and media with information directed at those in the host city. The issues are distributed in the Olympic City at locations such as the Main Press Center, the International Broadcast Center, official hotels, business centers, non-accredited media centers and more.

The Ultimate Insider's Guide: This is a pocket-sized compilation of names, contact information, facts, figures and fun designed for high level Games-time visitors and media in the Olympic city. It is also available free of charge online.

ATR SportAccord Special Edition: The magazine targets attendees of the SportAccord Convention, the marquee annual conference for the international sports federations. Around the Rings is one of three original media partners since 2005.

ATR Golden 25:  The Around the Rings Golden 25 is a ranking of the personalities who will have the greatest influence in the Olympics in the coming year.  It is one of the most coveted nominations in world sport.  The countdown begins mid-December  and ends around January 1. The 2011 edition was the 15th anniversary of the Golden 25.

ATR Special Editions for IOC Sessions: ATR has published a special edition magazine for every  IOC session since July 2001.

Online
Around The Rings Website:
Most ATR news is disseminated via its website. Four to five articles are published to the website every day. ATR eBulletins alert readers each time an article is published to the website. Featured content includes coverage of Bidding for the Games, Sochi 2014, Rio 2016, PyeongChang 2018, Tokyo 2020 the International Federations, ATR weekly newsletter, Op Ed column, ATR Datebook, photo galleries, Golden Opportunities, online special editions, and more.

Blog:
The ATR blog  on Wordpress provides a forum for more in depth discussion among readers and fans. The “Op Ed” column is frequently posted and a link to the company's Twitter page is posted to encourage discussion.

Correspondents, contributors, and staff
  Ed Hula, Editor and Founder
 Sheila Scott Hula, Publisher
 Eric Moran, Vice President of Sales
 Janice McDonald, Special Projects
 Kathy Kuczka, Circulation  Director
 Brian Baker, Partnership Development
Editorial Staff
 Gerard Farek, Assignment Editor
 Aaron Bauer, Writer
Correspondents
 Mark Bisson, European Editor
 Karen Rosen, Americas Editor
 Bob Mackin, Canada
 Christian Radnedge, London
 Heinz Peter Kreuzer, Germany
 Brian Pinelli, Europe

References

External links
 

American sport websites
History of the Olympics